Huinca or wingka is an exonym used by indigenous Mapuche to refer to non-Mapuche, white Chileans and Argentines. The term originated in the area of Concepción in Chile from the Mapuche language word we-inka, meaning new-Inca. This is a reference to Inca invaders who were later taken over by new Spanish invaders. This word is rendered as "inga" by Pedro de Valdivia in a letter to Charles V, Holy Roman Emperor. At the time of the initial contact Mapuches called horses "hueque ingas" in reference to the hueque according to Valdivia's letter to the Emperor. 

In modern times huinca has been used as a pejorative.

See also
Morohuinca
Yanacona

References

Mapuche words and phrases
Ethnonyms
Exonyms
Ethno-cultural designations
History of the Captaincy General of Chile
Ethnic and religious slurs